Broad Run is a  tributary of White Clay Creek located principally in New Garden Township, Chester County, Pennsylvania, in the United States.

The headwaters of Broad Run are in Kaolin, just south of Pennsylvania Route 41. Flowing southward, the stream enters a wide, deep valley. Between two hills east of Landenberg, Broad Run has been dammed to form Somerset Lake, the center of a development. Just south of the dam is the site of the Wilmington and Western Railroad's Broad Run Trestle, removed when the line to Landenberg was abandoned around 1940. Below, the valley narrows between hills again, and Broad Run enters London Britain Township and the White Clay Creek Preserve just before receiving Walnut Run. It empties into the White Clay about an eighth of a mile below.

Broad Run is included in the designation of the White Clay Creek as a Wild and Scenic River.

Tributaries
 Walnut Run

See also
 List of rivers of Pennsylvania

References

External links
 U.S. Geological Survey: PA stream gaging stations
 Somerset Lake

Rivers of Pennsylvania
Tributaries of the Christina River
Rivers of Chester County, Pennsylvania
Wild and Scenic Rivers of the United States